The Singu Min Bell, also known as the Maha Gandha Bell, is a large bell located at the Shwedagon Pagoda in Yangon, Myanmar (Burma). It was donated in 1779 by King Singu, the fourth king of Konbaung Dynasty. The official Pali name of the bell is Maha Gandha, which means "Great Sound".

Description
There are twelve lines of inscription on the bell. The inscriptions describe King Singu, who came to the throne on 9 June 1776, who ruled over the country of 16 provinces, cast and donated the bell to the Shwedagon Pagoda on 17 January 1779.

History
The bell was cast between 1776 and 1779. In 1825, British attempted to take it from the pagoda during first Anglo-Burmese War. However, the ship that carried the bell to Calcutta sank in Yangon River together with the bell. After several unsuccessful attempts to salvage the bell, British finally gave up. Then, a group of Burmese people successfully raised the bell from the riverbed and restored to its original position at the pagoda.

Current status
The bell is housed in a pavilion located on the northwest side of the pagoda's middle terrace.

See also
List of heaviest bells

References

1779 works
Burmese Buddhist architecture
Individual bells in Myanmar
Pitched percussion instruments